Caitlin Donerly Linney (born in Durham, NC), known professionally as Linney, is an American singer and songwriter. Her career began in 2011 with a kickstarter campaign.

Since then, she has written and performed multiple songs and won several awards. Her first award was for “best song” at the 28th Annual EVVY Awards. In 2016, she won the John Lennon Songwriting Contest for “Coming Back for More,” which led to a performance on the Main Stage at NAMM at the Anaheim Convention Center on January 23, 2016. She has released a studio album and two EPs.

Her single, “ That Night,” which is on her “Things We Say” EP, has been streamed more than 780,000 times on Spotify. On February 9, 2018, she released her single,  "Outta My Heart," which Halsey tweeted about. She continues to release singles and will tour in summer 2018.

Timeline 
 Graduated from Carolina Friends School (2007)
 Graduated from Emerson College (2011)
 Kickstarter Campaign (2011)
 Performed "Marie" at Gabriela Dance Theatre (2012) 
 Opened for Josh Turner at the Fox Majestic Theatre in Bakersfield, Calif. (2012)
 Released self-titled country-pop album at Hotel Cafe (2012)
 Won Los Angeles Round of the Texaco Country Showdown with KKGO Go Country 105 radio at Knott's Berry Farm (2013) 
 Wrote jingle, “Consider it Done,” for TeraVerde (2013)
 Opened for Easton Corbin at Club Nokia (2013) 
 Launched Pledge Music Project (2014)
 Released lyric video for “Heartbeat,” thanking cardiologists at the Duke Heart Center for saving her dad's life. Video played at Duke Medical Center. (2014)
 Wrote "Hope’s All In” for Hope International with American Idol Top 10 contestant Casey Abrams (2014) 
 Released “Hi, My Name Is” (2015)
 Released “Unravel Me” with Johan Vilborg (2015)
 Released “Voices” with APEK (2015)
 Released “Confetti” with Diego Moura (2015)
 Released music video for “Hi, My Name Is” with director Seamus George starring YouTube influencers Tay Monday, Supr Mary Face, IvyLeaguePunk and AprilEfff (2015)
 Wrote jingle “Call it Home” for MBA Opens Doors Foundation (2015)
 Released “That Night” (2015)
 Became a semi-finalist in Music City Big Break competition at Mercy Lounge in Nashville, Tenn. (2015)
 Won John Lennon Songwriting Contest and performed on the main stage at NAMM (2016)
 Released “Safe” with APEK, Cuebrick, Breathe Carolina (2016)
 Released “So Ready” with Noah Neiman (2016)
 Released music video for “That Night” directed by Christian Cardona and DP Eric Soboleski, which reached more than 126,000 views on YouTube (2016)
 Released EP: “Things We Say” (2016)
 Played at The Satellite (2016)
 Guest producer on the John Lennon bus in Miami as a part of the John Lennon Songwriting Contest (2016)
 Released EP: “Things We Do” (2016)

Discography

Extended plays

Studio albums

Singles

As featured artist

Covers

References

Living people
1989 births
Musicians from Durham, North Carolina
Singer-songwriters from North Carolina
21st-century American singers